Juan Manuel Mercadillo y Patiño, O.P. (1643–1704) was a Roman Catholic prelate who served as Bishop of Córdoba (1695–1704).

Biography
Juan Manuel Mercadillo was born in La Puebla de Almoradiel, Spain in 1643 and ordained a priest in the Order of Preachers. By 1665, he joined a Dominican missionary to the provinces of Bataan and Zambales in the Philippines. From 1678 to 1682, for two terms, he served as the Rector Magnificus of the University of Santo Tomas where he also taught theology and philosophy. On 7 August 1694, he was selected by the King of Spain as Bishop of Córdoba and confirmed by Pope Innocent XII on 8 November 1694. In November 1695, he was consecrated bishop. He served as Bishop of Córdoba until his death on 17 July 1704.

References

17th-century Roman Catholic bishops in Argentina
18th-century Roman Catholic bishops in Argentina
Bishops appointed by Pope Innocent XII
1643 births
1704 deaths
Dominican bishops
Rector Magnificus of the University of Santo Tomas
Roman Catholic bishops of Córdoba